The Dominion Astrophysical Observatory, located on Observatory Hill, in Saanich, British Columbia, was completed in 1918 by the Canadian government. The Dominion architect responsible for the building was Edgar Lewis Horwood.  The main instrument is the  Plaskett telescope, proposed and designed by John S. Plaskett in 1910 with the support of the International Union for Cooperation in Solar Research.

The observatory has been designated a national historic site of Canada, as it is a world-renowned facility where many discoveries about the nature of the Milky Way were made, and it was one of the world’s main astrophysical research centres until the 1960s.

Public programs
The Royal Astronomical Society of Canada, Victoria Centre, which has a long association with the Dominion Astrophysical Observatory and public outreach dating back to 1914,  holds  free public "star parties" at the DAO on select summer Saturday evenings. These events include solar and nighttime viewing with RASC and DAO telescopes, presentations, lectures, and displays.

Centre of the Universe

The Centre of the Universe was the public interpretive centre for the observatory that was regularly open to the public between May and September.  The centre featured interactive exhibits about astronomy, the work of the observatory and its parent organization, the NRC Herzberg Institute of Astrophysics.  There were also tours of the telescope and programs in the planetarium and video theatre. The centre was closed by the federal government in August 2013, which stated financial issues as the reason. The Friends of the Dominion Astrophysical Observatory Society (FDAO) was formed in 2015 with a goal of reinstating the programs terminated when the Centre of the Universe was closed. In May 2016, the FDAO signed a licence to occupy for the Centre of the Universe with the National Research Council.

Telescope construction

The building that houses the telescope was built by McAlpine-Robertson Company of Vancouver for a price of $75,000. Both the building and dome, made by Warner & Swasey Company, are double walled.

The mirror had to be reground twice, once due to a mysterious scratch and the second time due to a flaw in the grinding. This added two years to the completion time of the telescope, pushing the date back to 1918. The mirror was sent to Victoria by train, which arrived in Victoria six days later. The completed mirror was hauled up Little Saanich Mountain by horse and wagon.

Images of the construction are available

Use

Following completion, Plaskett remained the head of the observatory until 1935.

A spectrograph is fitted to the Cassegrain focus and an imaging charge-coupled device (CCD) is attached to the Newtonian focus.

In 1962, a  optical telescope was added to the observatory. The telescope, ordered in 1957, was made by Grubb Parsons of Newcastle-upon-Tyne, England. Its Coude focus is used with a room-sized spectrograph.

In 1995, the observatory was made the headquarters of the NRC Herzberg Institute of Astrophysics, which operates several Canadian telescopes, both optical and radio. The NRC collaborates with international partners such as the Canada-France-Hawaii Telescope.

The telescopes are in constant use and are open for visitors year round. An interpretive centre called the Centre of the Universe was opened in 2002 but closed in 2013 due to budgetary reasons. The Centre of the Universe was reopened in 2014 through an arrangement with the a working group consisting of members of the public who came together in response to the closure, along with the Royal Astronomical Society of Canada's Victoria Centre, and Science Venture at the University of Victoria. Work on the non-profit charity Friends of the Dominion Astrophysical Observatory began in 2014 because of the desire of the National Research Council to deal with a single organization with respect to the Centre of the Universe, and it was formally constituted and registered in 2015. The Friends of the Dominion Astrophysical Observatory now runs the education programmes on-site and online.

, the Dominion Astrophysical Observatory Director was Dr James De Francesco.

World-record status

The Plaskett telescope was possibly planned to be the largest telescope in the world but delays meant it was completed and saw "first light" on May 6, 1918, six months after the 100-inch Hooker telescope at Mount Wilson Observatory. However, although the Hooker telescope achieved a first light on November 1, 1917, it was not really opened until 1918, which was also affected by delays especially from World War I. At this point most observatories still had 19th-century-era refractors of at most  in aperture, as a shift to reflectors was still growing.

It also surpassed the  metal mirror Leviathan of Parsonstown, built in 1845 but dismantled by the 1910s.

The Plaskett telescope remained the second largest until the  reflector at David Dunlap Observatory in 1935 (also in Canada) debuted.

Top 2 in 1918:

The next largest were the Harvard College Observatory  and the Mount Wilson 60-inch Hale.

See also
NRC Herzberg Institute of Astrophysics
Dominion Radio Astrophysical Observatory
List of largest optical reflecting telescopes
List of largest optical telescopes in the 20th century

References

External links 
Official Site
Dominion Astrophysical Observatory Clear Sky Clock Forecasts of observing conditions.
District of Saanich Significant Buildings - scroll down the see the building
Paper by John S. Plaskett on the construction of the DAO
Paper about 48" telescope
Richard A. Jarrell,  The Instrument was Instrumental: Plaskett's Telescope and Canadian Astronomy between the wars
John S. Plaskett, History of Astronomy in British Columbia
Helen Sawyer Hogg, Memories of the Plaskett Era of the Dominion Astrophysical Observatory 1931–1934
Photo of DAO, 1920, U. Wash Digital Collections
 (Book from 1923 about history and construction of the observatory)

Astronomical observatories in Canada
Buildings and structures in British Columbia
Museums in British Columbia
National Historic Sites in British Columbia
Planetaria in Canada
Saanich, British Columbia
Science museums in Canada
Defunct museums in Canada
Tourist attractions in British Columbia